Witness Uganda (previously titled Invisible Thread) is a musical with book, music, and lyrics by Matt Gould and Griffin Matthews. It was based on the true story of Matthews' humanitarian trips to Uganda, and his work to fund his nonprofit organization, Uganda Project. The musical premiered under the title Witness Uganda on February 4, 2014 at Cambridge's American Repertory Theater, and ran through March 16, 2014. Under the title Invisible Thread, the show transferred to off-Broadway's Second Stage Theatre in a production which ran during December 2015.

The show returned to its original title of Witness Uganda for a February 2019 run at the Wallis Annenberg Center for the Performing Arts in Los Angeles.

Synopsis
The American Repertory Theatre wrote: 

The story was based on Matthews' experience in Uganda, as well as Gould's Peace Corps experience in Mauritania and other similar experiences.

Production history
The idea and creation for the musical began in 2008 when Gould and Matthews needed money for their non-profit organisation The Uganda Project. Gould recorded Matthews ranting about his frustrations and how they could not raise money for the non-profit. Gould composed music and incorporated it with the recording, beginning their project.

Gould and Matthews initially performed the show by themselves to raise funds for The Uganda Project. They were invited to perform at TEDx and Disney ASCAP. During their Disney ASCAP performance, they were able to impress the composer/lyricist Stephen Schwartz, who composed notable musicals such as Wicked. Gould said of the experience, "The show was a mess at that time, but we knew what the heart of it was."

Gould and Matthews brought in additional members of the creative team, who also had foreign aid experience. Choreographer Darrell Grand Moultrie previously taught dance in South Africa and the interns hired, mostly from Harvard University, had volunteering experience in Indonesia, Tanzania, and Uganda.

Original production
The show premiered under the title Witness Uganda on February 4, 2014 at the American Repertory Theater. The show was directed by Diane Paulus, with Shira Milikowsky as the associate director.

The show starred Griffin Matthews as Griffin, Michael Luwoye as Jacob, Adeola Role as Joy, Emma Hunton as Ryan, Nicolette Robinson as Eden, Kristolyn Lloyd as Grace, Jamar Williams as Ibrahim, Tyrone Davis, Jr. as Ronny, and the ensemble of Melody Betts, Rodrick Covington, Kevin Curtis, LaTrisa Harper, Aisha Jackson, and Jamard Richardson.

Later productions
The musical came to Diane Paulus' attention after it won the 2012 Richard Rodgers Award for Musical Theater. She was impressed and noted it was like nothing she ever heard or read before. While she was working on Pippin at the American Repertory Theater, Schwartz mentioned there was a musical about Uganda that would interest her. The musical later won the Richard Rodgers Award for Musical Theater again in 2014.

Under the direction of Diane Paulus, the show had a staged reading on October 23 and 24, 2014. The cast included Julius Thomas III, Adeola Role, Adam Kantor, Michael Luwoye, Kristolyn Lloyd, Nicolette Robinson, Jamar Williams, Tyrone Davis, Jr., Amber Iman, Aisha Jackson, LaTrisa Harper, Rodrick Covington, Kevin Curtis and Jamard Richardson.

The title was changed to Invisible Thread in 2015, for a production at the Second Stage Theatre. Previews began on October 31, 2015 and it officially opened on December 2, 2015. It closed in late December 2015.

Musical numbers
2015 off-Broadway (Second Stage Theatre)

 Act I
 "All Are Welcome" – Company
 "Kyussa" – Company
 "To The Hill" – Company
 "Beautiful" - Griffin, Ibahim, Eden, Grace, Ronny, Ensemble
 "Invisible Thread" – Griffin & Ryan
 "I Have a Lover" – Griffin & Jacob
 "The Library" – Company
 "Put It All on the Line" – Company
 "Weeds" – Jacob & Ensemble
 "New World" – Company

 Act II
 "Internet Song" – Griffin, Ryan, Ibrahim, Eden, Jacob, Grace, Ronny
 "Bricks" – Company
 "If I Could Turn Around" – Griffin, Ryan & Company
 "Phone Call Delay" – Griffin, Ryan, Ibrahim, Eden, Grace, Ronny
 "Bela Musana" – Company
 "I'd Cross the Blue" – Ensemble
 "Fragile" – Company
 "Njakuangula" – Company

Casts

* Jeremy Pope played the role of Griffin at certain performances

References

External links
Uganda Project
Witness Uganda

2014 musicals
Musicals inspired by real-life events
Off-Broadway musicals